Long Arm of the Law (省港旗兵, lit. "Red Guards in Guangzhou and Hong Kong") is a 1984 Hong Kong film directed by Johnny Mak Tong-hung.

The film was followed by three sequels: Long Arm of the Law II (1987), Long Arm of the Law III (1989) and Long Arm of the Law IV: Underground Express (1990) .

Plot

Cast 
 Chen Jing
 Kong Lung
 Ben Lam Kwok Bun
 David Lam Wai
 Ng Hoi Tin
 Shum Wai
 Wong Kin
 Wong Yan Tat
 Yeung Min
 Tommy Wong Kwong Leung - cameo
 Charles Rhys Rowlands

Awards
4th Annual Hong Kong Film Awards (1985):
 Won - Best Supporting Actor (Shum Wai)
 Won - Best Editing (Cheung Yiu-Chung)
 Nominated - Best Film
 Nominated - Best Director (Johnny Mak Tong-Hung)
 Nominated - Best Screenplay (Philip Chan Yan-Kin)
 Nominated - Best New Performer (Lin Wei)
 Nominated - Best Cinematography (Koo Kwok-Wah)
 Nominated - Best Action Choreography (Billy Chan Wui-Ngai)
 Nominated - Best Original Score (Lam Mo-Tak)

Long Arm of the Law was ranked #6 on the list of Best 100 Chinese Motion Pictures during the 24th Hong Kong Film Awards ceremony on 27 March 2005.

See also
 Kowloon Walled City

External links
 IMDb entry
 HK cinemagic entry
 loveHKfilm entry

1984 films
1980s crime films
Hong Kong crime films
1980s Hong Kong films